Roles is a studio album by American pianist keyboardist Joe Sample, released in 1987 on MCA Records. The album peaked at No. 8 on the Billboard Contemporary Jazz Charts.

Tracklisting
Adapted from album's text.

Personnel
Adapted from album's text.
Art Direction, Design – Kathleen Covert
Assistant Engineer – Glenn D. Kurtz
Assistant Mixer – Liz Cluse
Bass – Abraham Laboriel
Coordinator Production Coordination – Ceferino "Sonny" Abelardo*, Pamela Hope Lobue
Drums – Edward "Sonny" Emory II
Engineer, Mixed By – F. Byron Clark
Guitar – Dean Parks
Guitar (Solo) – Rick Zunigar (tracks: B2)
Keyboards, Producer, Piano – Joe Sample
Marimba (Solo) – Bobby Hutcherson (tracks: A4)
Percussion – Lenny Castro
Photography By – Mindas (2)
Producer – Wilton Felder
Synthesizer [Programming] – Dr. George Shaw
Trumpet [Muted Trumpet] – Sal Marquez (tracks: A2)
Trumpet [Solo] – Sal Marquez (tracks: B1)
Vibraphone [Vibes] – Bobby Hutcherson (tracks: B3)
Voice – Jim Gilstrap (tracks: A1), Kathy Brown (tracks: A1), *Michael Tompkins (tracks: A1), Von Frajjette (tracks: A1)

References

1983 albums
Joe Sample albums
MCA Records albums